Doctor in the Nest is a 1979 comedy novel by the British writer Richard Gordon. Part of the long-running Doctor series, it finds Sir Lancelot Spratt struggling against cuts in the NHS which leaves his hospital in bad shape.

References

Bibliography
 Pringle, David. Imaginary People: A Who's who of Fictional Characters from the Eighteenth Century to the Present Day. Scolar Press, 1996.

1979 British novels
Novels by Richard Gordon
Comedy novels
Novels set in hospitals
Heinemann (publisher) books